The 2020 Seattle Dragons season was the first season for the Seattle Dragons as a professional American football franchise. They played as charter members of the XFL, one of eight teams to compete in the league for the 2020 season. The Dragons played their home games at CenturyLink Field and were led by head coach Jim Zorn.

Their inaugural season was cut short due to the COVID-19 pandemic and the XFL officially suspended operations for the remainder of the season on March 20, 2020.

Offseason

XFL Draft

Tier 1 Quarterback Allocations

Phase 1: Skill Players

Phase 2: Offensive Line

Phase 3: Defensive Front Seven

Phase 4: Defensive Backs

Phase 5: Open Draft

Final Roster

Staff

Standings

Schedule
All times Pacific

Game summaries

Week 1: at DC Defenders

The Seattle Dragons played in the first game of the revived XFL, playing on the road against the DC Defenders. The Dragons scored the first touchdown of the new XFL on a 14-yard pass from Brandon Silvers to Austin Proehl in the 1st quarter.

Week 2: vs. Tampa Bay Vipers

Week 3: vs. Dallas Renegades

Week 4: at St. Louis BattleHawks

Week 5: at Houston Roughnecks

References

Seattle
2020 in sports in Washington (state)
Seattle Dragons